Houcine Camara or just Houcine (born 19 August 1980 in Nancy), is a French singer.

Biography
He was born in a musical family. His family was Muslim . His father was a singer, who for 10 years had also directed "Le palais des danses africaines de Nancy". His mother was an artist designer of oriental fashion. At 6, he studied at the Nancy Conservatory where he learned to play the piano and violin. He also practiced sports, notably soccer. At 15, he composed music on the piano and at 16 formed a groove band with his brother and performed at various public occasions.

Houcine auditioned for second edition of French TV reality show Star Academy where he was a finalist.

His first single, "Être un homme comme vous" was used on the soundtrack of the movie The Jungle Book 2, and became a successful record in France, Belgium-Wallonia, and Switzerland, where it became a top ten hit. Houcine has two sons, Lenny and Noah.

Discography

Singles
 2003 : "Être un homme comme vous" – #3 in Belgium, #6 in France, #9 in Switzerland
 2003 : "Ce que tu veux de moi" – #72 in France
 2004 : "Donne-moi du temps" – #64 in France

References

1980 births
French pop singers
Living people
Musicians from Nancy, France
Star Academy (France) participants
21st-century French singers
21st-century French male singers